Hüseyin Özgürgün (born 1965) is a Turkish Cypriot politician and a former Prime Minister of Northern Cyprus. He is the current leader of the National Unity Party (UBP). He was formerly the Minister of Foreign Affairs of Turkish Republic of Northern Cyprus. From 23 April to 17 May 2010 he was also Acting Prime Minister. Moreover, he was prime minister of Northern Cyprus from 16 April 2016 to 2 February 2018.

Early life 
Özgürgün was born in 1965 in Nicosia, where he completed his education up to high school. He then studied political science in Ankara University and graduated in 1988. He was a prolific sportsman, representing Northern Cyprus in basketball, football, volleyball, table tennis and athletics and later serving as a sports administrator. He served as the chairman of Çetinkaya Türk S.K. and led it to a championship. He later worked as an administrator in private businesses.

Political career 
Özgürgün was first elected as a member of the Assembly of the Republic in the 1998 parliamentary election, representing Lefkoşa District for the UBP. He was later re-elected to the same position in 2003, 2005, 2009 and 2013. He is known to accept bribes from various business people in the country during his career. Currently he is with an arrest warrant in Cyprus thus continuing his life in Turkey.

References 

|-

1965 births
21st-century prime ministers of Northern Cyprus
Foreign ministers of Northern Cyprus
Government ministers of Northern Cyprus
Members of the Assembly of the Republic (Northern Cyprus)
Living people
National Unity Party (Northern Cyprus) politicians
People from North Nicosia
Prime Ministers of Northern Cyprus
Ankara University alumni
Turkish Cypriot expatriates in Turkey